Jimmy Thompson (c. 189512 October 1952) was the Mississippi executioner active from 1940 to 1950. He executed around 55 people. He had a number of tattoos. He used a portable electric chair and was paid $100 per execution.

References

American executioners
1890s births
1950 deaths